State Road 248 (NM 248) is a  state highway in the US state of New Mexico. NM 248's southern terminus is at NM 176 in Eunice, and the northern terminus is at NM 18 north of Eunice.

History
NM 248 was formerly the northern portion of NM 207. NM 248 was designated on May 25, 2006. NM 248 was formerly applied to Ruins Road in Aztec.

Major intersections

See also

References

External links

248
Transportation in Lea County, New Mexico